Střítež is a municipality and village in Český Krumlov District in the South Bohemian Region of the Czech Republic. It has about 400 inhabitants.

Administrative parts
Villages of Kaplice-nádraží and Raveň are administrative parts of Střítež.

References

Villages in Český Krumlov District